County Route 560 (abbreviated CR 560 and locally known as Tuttles Corner Road) is a county highway in the U.S. state of New Jersey. The highway extends  from U.S. Route 206 and County Route 521 in Sandyston Township. CR 560 ends at the Pennsylvania state line, where it becomes Pike County Quadrant Route 2019, which connects to Pennsylvania Route 739. CR 560's entire length is in Sandyston. However, CR 560 does pass through the hamlet of Layton.

Route description 

CR 560 begins at the Dingmans Ferry Bridge over the Delaware River in Sandyston Township, where the road continues into Pennsylvania as SR 2019. From the bridge, the route heads east on two-lane undivided Tuttles Corner Road into forests within the Delaware Water Gap National Recreation Area, crossing Old Mine Road, which provides access to the Peters Valley School of Craft. The road turns northeast into more wooded areas with some fields before turning south into agricultural areas with some homes and leaving the Delaware Water Gap National Recreation Area. CR 560 turns east and intersects CR 640, at which point it heads into the residential community of Layton. In Layton, the route intersects CR 645. 

Upon leaving Layton, the road turns south and heads into woodland with some fields and residences. CR 560 curves east and comes to an intersection with Ennis Road, which is the closed former alignment of CR 615. At this point, the route enters dense forests. CR 560 reaches its eastern terminus at an intersection with US 206 / CR 521.

History 
When County Route 521 was assigned in the 1950s, it originally made the alignments of County Route 560 and the Old Mine Road north of CR 560. Then, no route originally crossed over the Dingmans Bridge to Pennsylvania Route 739. CR 521 was later rerouted off the highway, which extended its multiplex with U.S. Route 206. US 206 and CR 521 are now the highway's eastern terminus. When the route was completely re-routed, Tuttles Corners Road became CR 560, which was extended to the Dingmans Bridge to PA 739 (now SR 2019). The Old Mine Road segment became a federal maintained road, and there are no remains of the original 521.

Major intersections

See also

References

External links

New Jersey 5xx Routes (Dan Moraseski)
CR 560 pictures

560
560